For the Love of Nancy is a 1994 American made-for-television drama film directed by Paul Schneider. The film, based on a true story, deals with anorexia nervosa. Lead actress Tracey Gold was actually recovering from the disease while making the movie and used her own life experience for the portrayal of Nancy.

Plot

Nancy Walsh is a high school graduate who is apprehensive about the future. After losing weight after having her wisdom teeth removed, she notices changes in her body and becomes obsessed with her physical appearance. When she begins college, she becomes withdrawn and remains conscious about her weight. She embarks upon a regimented exercising routine, hardly eats and rarely interacts with anybody. At college, she spends most of her time in her room, where she obsesses about keeping her living space in meticulous order.

Although most of her friends, neighbors and brother Tommy notice that she is losing a lot of weight, her mother ignores the changes in Nancy. Her brother Patrick is the first one to confront her about it and at a Christmas party, everyone is shocked by how thin she looks. They confront her and she promises them that everything is going to be okay. Her mother, Sally believes her, but her uncle convinces her that if they remain complacent, Nancy could die.

Soon, Nancy admits to being anorexic, revealing that she does not know how to stop the disorder. She is reluctant to be taken to the hospital, but Sally is keen for her to get help to ultimately recover. She enters a group session, but feels she doesn't belong there. Nevertheless, she refuses to eat and even goes as far as hiding food, to fake her progress.

She is soon caught, and the doctor decides to connect her to a feeding tube. After a while, she makes progress, gaining six pounds. This upsets her, and because she is over eighteen, she is able to sign herself out of the hospital. Upon her return home, she continues starving herself, much to the distress of her mother. When she finds plates with food under her bed, she confronts her and realizes that Nancy is lying.

Nancy resists any attempts at help and doesn't even respond when she is forced to eat. Her mother asks her in tears why she is doing it, but she doesn't explain. Tommy is afraid that she will soon die. Meanwhile, she becomes extremely sick from malnutrition, and is eventually hospitalized because of a kidney disease. Her parents feel that they can't do anything but watch her die.

Desperate, Sally decides to go to Dr. Partana to ask how their family can help Nancy. The doctor informs Sally that Nancy needs to have someone become her medical guardian. Tom, Nancy's father, decides to go to court against Nancy for the guardianship.  Realizing that her parents are only trying to help her, Nancy gives in and lets her father become her guardian. Tom sends Nancy back to the hospital, where Nancy admits having anorexia nervosa and in the end gains weight and starts to regain a normal life. She now feels open to talk about her anorexia.

Cast
Tracey Gold as Nancy Walsh 
Jill Clayburgh as Sally Walsh
Cameron Bancroft as Patrick Walsh
Mark-Paul Gosselaar as Tommy Walsh
Deanna Milligan as Debbie
Michael MacRae as Uncle Tommy
William Devane as Tom Walsh
Garwin Sanford as Dr. Partana
Michael Buie as Mike

References

External links

1994 films
1994 television films
1994 drama films
American drama television films
Films about eating disorders
Films about psychiatry
Body image in popular culture
ABC Motion Pictures films
Films directed by Paul Schneider (director)
1990s American films
1990s English-language films